Dr Gary Lambert is an American rugby union and rugby league footballer, poker player and chiropractor who represented the United States in the 1987 Rugby World Cup.

Lambert attended Louisiana State University.

Playing career
Lambert originally played rugby union for the White Plains Rugby Football Club. He represented the United States in 18 tests, including at the 1987 Rugby World Cup, and also captained the national side.

Lambert later switched to rugby league, playing for the United States in the 1996 Super League World Nines tournament.

Lambert has played poker since 1992 and won a World Series of Poker Circuit event in 2011.

References

Living people
American rugby league players
1959 births
American chiropractors
Place of birth missing (living people)
American rugby union players
American poker players
United States international rugby union players